Andrés Molteni and Fernando Romboli were the defending champions, but both players chose not to participate.

Sergio Galdós and Guido Pella won the title, defeating Marcelo Demoliner and Roberto Maytín in the final, 6–3, 6–1.

Seeds

Draw

References
 Main Draw

Lima Challenger - Doubles
Lima Challenger